Orma Mathram is a 2011 Malayalam-language drama film directed by Madhu Kaithapram and starring Dileep, Priyanka Nair, Master Sidharth, Dhanya Mary Varghese, Nedumudi Venu in the main roles. The screenplay was written by C. V. Balakrishnan based on a story by Rahim Kadavath.

Plot
The film revolves around Pradeep, a clerk at a lawyer's office. Pradeep had an intercaste marriage with Deepa long ago. Pradeep and Shafia along with their five-year-old son, were happily living in Fort Kochi. Pradeep wants his son to be a judge, which he couldn't become. Here happens a tragedy in their life which completely shatters Pradeep and Deepa. Their son goes missing and the story follows the father's journey in search of his son.

The film also displays a father and son relation and the love and sacrifice of a father

Cast
 Dileep as Pradeep
 Priyanka Nair as Deepa, Pradeep's wife
 Master Sidharth as Deepu,  Pradeeps's son
 Jagathy Sreekumar as Radhakrishna Warrier, the lawyer 
 Dhanya Mary Varghese
 Nedumudi Venu
Sathi Premji as Jew lady,  wife of Nedumudi Venu (Maria Aunty)
 Salim Kumar
 Harishree Ashokan
 Hakim Rawther as man at orphanage

Reception

The film was critically acclaimed but as being an art film it was not well received in the theaters. And undoubtedly it is one of the best performances in Dileep's career. Master Siddharth won the mathrubhumi film awards 2011 and Amrita TV film awards for the best child actor in the film orma mathram.

References

 

2010s Malayalam-language films
Indian drama films
Films shot in Kochi
Films directed by Madhu Kaithapram
Films scored by Kaithapram Viswanathan Namboothiri